Dima Sara (also Romanized as Dīmā Sarā) is a village in Malfejan Rural District, in the Central District of Siahkal County, Gilan Province, Iran. At the 2006 census, its population was 48, in 15 families.

References 

Populated places in Siahkal County